Rincewind is a fictional character appearing in several of the Discworld novels by Terry Pratchett. He is a failed student at the Unseen University for wizards in Ankh-Morpork, and is often described by scholars as "the magical equivalent to the number zero". He spends most of his time running away from bands of people who want to kill him for various reasons. The fact that he's still alive and running is explained in that, although he was born with a wizard's spirit, he has the body of a long-distance sprinter. Rincewind is also renowned for being able to solve minor problems by turning them into major disasters. His unique "skill" is implied to be due to being the chosen one of "The Lady", the anthropomorphic personification of luck (both good and bad).

Rincewind was portrayed by David Jason in the film adaption of The Colour of Magic and Pratchett said in an interview that he unwittingly took Rincewind's name from "Churm Rincewind", a fictitious person referred to in early "'Beachcomber" columns in the Daily Express.

Appearances

In books
In Rincewind's debut in The Colour of Magic, he acts as a guide for the tourist Twoflower, who hails from the Agatean Empire in the Counterweight Continent, a continent across the disc from the 'hub' continent where Ankh-Morpork is situated. He is recruited for this job as he is the only one who can communicate with Twoflower (they use Be-Trobi as a lingua franca), as Twoflower agreed to pay him in rhinu (consisting of large gold coins), and as the Patrician of Ankh-Morpork wished to prevent an Agatean attack on Ankh-Morpork sparked by Twoflower's death. He and Twoflower wander around for quite a while, and get chased by everything from the personification of Death to a Lovecraftian creature named Bel-Shamharoth.

Even after Rincewind and Twoflower part ways at the end of The Light Fantastic—with Twoflower giving Rincewind his sapient-pearwood Luggage in the process—Rincewind's adventures continue to see him being chased across various regions of the Discworld in spite of, or often driven by, his desire to find somewhere he can relish boredom in peace and quiet.

During the events of The Last Hero, in which the Discworld is at risk of being destroyed if Cohen the Barbarian and his Silver Horde succeed in their plan to "return fire to the Gods with interest", Rincewind states that he does not wish to volunteer for a dangerous mission. When he is asked to explain himself, he states that he's merely refusing for appearances sake, because, as someone is bound to nominate him for the upcoming mission eventually because of his knowledge of the geography of Cori Celesti or his friendship with Cohen, even if he refuses, somehow events will conspire against him and he'll end up going on the mission anyway as he attempts to escape.

In Raising Steam, Rincewind is mentioned in footnotes, which refer to him as a professor at the university, studying the effects of different flowers on the nervous system.

In other media
Rincewind is the main character of the text adventure The Colour of Magic, which was based on the book of the same name.

Rincewind is also the player character of the 1995 Discworld video game. After a dragon is spotted in Ankh-Morpork, Unseen University's archchancellor sends Rincewind to find out the source of the trouble. In the sequel to this game, Discworld II: Missing Presumed...!?, Death disappears and the archchancellor puts Rincewind in charge of finding him and convincing him to get back to work. In both of the games, Rincewind is voiced by Eric Idle.

Character
Rincewind has the ability to pick up the essentials of foreign languages quickly and fluency only slightly less quickly, and appears to have the ability to blend in with any situation. During The Colour of Magic, when he was projected into a universe that may or may not have been our own, he assumed the role of a nuclear physicist. In keeping with his nature, the role was as a physicist who specialized in the 'breakaway oxidation phenomena' of certain reactors—or, to put another way, what happens when those reactors caught fire (Terry Pratchett served as the press officer for several nuclear power plants before he became a full-time writer). Rincewind speculated on the nature of science, expressing in The Colour of Magic the hope that there was something "better than magic" in the world, and speculated on the possibility of harnessing lightning, for which he was mocked by "sensible" Discworld citizens. Rincewind is also fairly streetwise. He is often depicted as a harsh critic of the selected stupidities surrounding him, even though he can't help but comply with whatever absurdity that arises. For example, in the computer games starring him, he consistently spotted the ludicrous events around him and would then make jokes and puns to the unaware participants. He also seems to display, despite his apparent failure as a wizard, a fairly extensive magical knowledge, recognizing various spells, magical artefacts and concepts throughout his escapades.

Some of Rincewind's talents once stemmed from a semi-sentient and highly destructive spell that had lodged itself inside his mind and scared off all other spells (mentioned in The Colour of Magic and The Light Fantastic; though it must be stated that even without the spell's interference he was still an extremely incompetent wizard). The spell occasionally tries to make itself heard whenever Rincewind is going through a stressful time; as he was falling to his near-death, he said the first seven out of eight words of the spell.

In Sourcery and Unseen Academicals Rincewind claims that he never knew his mother as she ran away before he was born.

Rincewind has received several titles during his stay at the Unseen University; some of them because nobody else wants them, others to keep him busy doing work unrelated to magic. These titles and their accompanying tenure include the condition that he cannot have any salary, influence, or opinions. They do, however, include meals, his laundry done, and (as a result of all the impressive-sounding but essentially meaningless titles that have been bestowed upon him) up to eight buckets of coal a day during the entire year.

Concept and creation
Pratchett said that Rincewind's job is "to meet more interesting people", saying that there is not much he can do with a character who's a coward and doesn't care who knows it. Pratchett noted that one of his major problems was that he has a "lack of an inner monologue".

The Luggage
The Luggage is a large chest that follows Rincewind literally wherever he goes—even onto Roundworld, which Rincewind initially only visited virtually. It is made of sapient pearwood (a magical, intelligent plant that is nearly extinct, impervious to magic, and only grows in a few places outside the Agatean Empire, generally on sites of very old magic). As such, whilst considered oddities in the Hubland continent, such chests are commonplace in the Agatean Empire. It can produce hundreds of little legs protruding from its underside and can move very fast if the need arises. It has been described as "half suitcase, half homicidal maniac". In Interesting Times, it has been demonstrated that Luggages are capable of reproducing, which Twoflower suggests was chiefly the result of what the Luggage learnt in Ankh-Morpork.

Its function is to act as both a luggage carrier and bodyguard for its owner, against whom no threatening motion should be made. The Luggage is fiercely defensive of its owner, and is generally homicidal in nature, killing or eating several people and monsters and destroying various ships, walls, doors, geographic features, and other obstacles throughout the series. Its mouth contains "lots of big square teeth, white as sycamore, and a pulsating tongue, red as mahogany". The inside area of The Luggage does not appear to be constrained by its external dimensions, and contains many conveniences: even when it has just devoured a monster, the next time it opens the owner will find his underwear, neatly pressed and smelling slightly of lavender. It is unknown exactly what happens to anyone it 'eats'.

One of the most notable features of The Luggage is its ability to follow its current owner anywhere, including such places as inside its owner's mind, off the edge of the Disc, Death's Domain, inside the Octavo, the Dungeon Dimensions, and even (literally) to Hell and back. Like all luggage, it's constantly getting lost and having to track its owner down. It has only one way of overcoming obstacles, and that is by simply ignoring them and smashing a hole through them—including a wall to a magic shop that had since relocated to another city by magical means.

Reception and legacy
In her review of Night Watch, A. S. Byatt noted the lack of recent appearances of Rincewind and the more grim presentation of the Witches and Ankh-Morpork as signs of Pratchett's imagination getting darker.

While the current release (version 3.0.0) of VLC media player is named Vetinari, a previous release (version 2.1.0) was named Rincewind.  Other releases of VLC media player have been named "The Luggage" (version 1.1.0), and release 2.0.0 was named "Twoflower", the character that gave The Luggage to Rincewind (in The Light Fantastic).

Rincewind and Discworld witch Nanny Ogg appeared on first-class Royal Mail stamps in March 2011.  The issue included wizards, witches and enchanters from British fiction, and also included characters from the Arthurian Legend, from J. K. Rowling's Harry Potter series, and from the Narnia series of C. S. Lewis.  Paul Whitelaw, writing for The Scotsman, felt that David Jason was "clearly several decades too old" to be Rincewind in the film adaption of The Colour of Magic.

The Cretaceous gymnosperm species Phoenicopsis rincewindii is named after Rincewind.

References

External links
 Discworld & Pratchett Wiki
 SkyOne's The Colour of Magic 
 Rincewind's reading order

Discworld characters
Fictional professors
Fictional schoolteachers
Fictional wizards
Literary characters introduced in 1983